The Cork Junior B Hurling Championship (known for sponsorship reasons as the Co-Op Superstores Cork Junior B Hurling Championship and abbreviated to the Cork JBHC) is an annual hurling competition organised by the Cork County Board of the Gaelic Athletic Association and contested by the second tier junior clubs in the county of Cork in Ireland. It is the seventh tier overall in the entire Cork hurling championship system.

The Cork Junior B Championship was introduced in 1984 as a countywide competition for "weaker" junior teams. At the time of its creation it was the fourth tier of Cork hurling.

The Cork Junior B Championship is unlike all other championships in Cork in that it doesn't include a group stage. In its current format, the teams compete in a double-elimination tournament which culminates with a final. The winner of the Cork Junior B Championship qualifies for the subsequent Munster Club Championship.

The competition has been won by 30 teams, 6 of which have won it more than once. Ballyhooly, Castletownroche, Harbour Rovers, Lisgoold, O'Donovan Rossa and Randal Óg are the most successful teams in the tournament's history, having won it 2 times each.

Freemount are the reigning champions after beating Randal Óg by 1-18 to 1-17 in the 2022 final.

In 2015, a second Junior B Championship (known as Inter-Divisional Championship) was introduced to run parallel with the traditional Junior B Championship. Mirroring the Junior A Hurling Championship, this competition allows all the Junior B divisional champions an opportunity to win a county. Unlike the traditional Championship, second string teams can enter the divisional championships and potentially win the county championship.

2023 Teams

County Championship (8)

Interdivisional Championship (7)

Formats

County Championship
Round 1: All teams contest this round. An open draw is made to determine the pairings. The winning teams advance to Round 3 of the championship. The losing teams advance directly to Round 2

Round 2: All the round 1 losing teams contest this round. An open draw is made to determine the pairings. The winning teams of these games advance Round 3. The losing teams enter the relegation play-offs.

Round 3: All the Round 1 and Round 2 winners contest this round. An open draw is made to determine the pairings. The winning teams of these games advance directly to the Quarter-Finals. The losing teams are eliminated from the championship.

Quarter-finals: Eight teams contest this round. An open draw is made to determine the eight pairings. The four winning teams advance directly to the Semi-Finals. The four losing teams are eliminated from the championship.

Semi-finals: Four teams contest this round. An open draw is made to determine the two pairings. The two winning teams advance directly to the final. The two losing teams are eliminated from the championship.

Final: The final is contested by the two semi-final winners. The winner is promoted to their respective Junior A Division.

Inter-Divisional Championship
Quarter-finals: Six divisional winners contest this round with the remaining one receiving a bye. The three winning teams advance directly to the Semi-Finals. The four losing teams are eliminated from the championship.

Semi-finals: Four teams contest this round. The two winning teams advance directly to the final. The two losing teams are eliminated from the championship.

Final: The final is contested by the two semi-final winners. The winner is promoted to their respective Junior A Division.

List of finals

Roll of Honour

Junior B Inter-Divisional Hurling Championship

List of finals

Roll of Honour

References

Hurling competitions in County Cork
Junior hurling county championships